Shah Saeed Ahmed Raipuri (January 192626 September 2012) was a Pakistani Muslim scholar as well as the spiritual heir of Khanqah-e-Rahimia Raipur (India) and a contemporary authority of Shah Waliullah's thought.
He was among prominent disciples of Maulana Shah Ilyas Kandhalvi, founder of Tablighi Jamaat and Sheikh-ul-Hadith Maulana Muhammad Zakariya. Rising above practical politics, on the basis of the thought of Shah Waliullah, Sheikh-ul-Hind Maulana Mahmood-ul-Hasan, Shah Abdul Qadir Raipuri, Maulana Ubaidullah Sindhi and Maulana Husain Ahmad Madani, he established JTI in 1967. Under his supervision, a journal named "Azm (عزم)" was launched in 1974 which is still being published. In 1987, he established an organization "Tanzeem Fikr-e-Waliullahi" based on the philosophical works of Shah Waliullah. He established "Shah Waliullah Media Foundation" to publish literature based on Waliullahi philosophy. He also established Rahimia Institute of Quranic Sciences, Lahore in 2001. There are currently four other campuses of Rahimia Institute of Quranic Sciences in Karachi, Sukkur, Multan and Rawalpindi. Thousands of youth are associated with the institute through the organization of seminars and other events.

In 1992, he was appointed the successor of his father Shah Abdul Aziz Raipuri.

Background 
Shah Saeed Ahmed Raipuri was the eldest son of Shah Abdul Aziz Raipuri. He started to learn from Abdul Qadir Raipuri when he was 5 years old and spent thirty years of his life with him. During 1947 and 1948, he studied in Madrasa Mazahiral Uloom. Shah Saeed Ahmed Raipuri was the fourth Sheikh after Shah Abdul Rahim Raipuri (1853–1919), who was himself a Naqshbandi Pir born in Tigri, Ambala, India. Shah Abdul Rahim Raipuri established Khanqah-i-Aliya Rahimia in Raipur which, later on, became one of the leading centres of Deobandi learning. Like many of Abdul Rahim's successors, Shah Saeed Ahmed Raipuri replicated it in Lahore by the name of Idara Rahimia Ulum-i-Qurania in 2001. The network of Nizam ul Madaris ur Rahimia is very extensive with innumerable madaris (religious schools) affiliated with it throughout Pakistan.

Quotes 
He was a Muslim Sufi, scholar and thinker, known for the reformist, revolutionary and progressive ideology. Here are some of his quotes:
 If rulers are unworthy and rights of humanity violated, then work for a revolution to offset decadence.
 Allah ordered the Prophet (peace be upon him) to eradicate tyranny from society, to help oppressed people, and to free all people of the world from oppression and injustice.
 The purpose and ideology of the Quran is to worship Allah and eradicate injustice from this world and give freedom to the oppressed. It is the divine order of the Quran to eradicate poverty, establish peace, and put an end to an environment of war and fighting. It is the divine order of the Quran to fulfil the rights of your wives, children, parents, brothers and sisters, relatives, and neighbours, and going even further, the Quran enjoins upon us to fulfil the rights of all humanity.
 Namaz was supposed to create Walis. Instead, nowadays, we see that the traits of people offering the same Namaz are that of tyrants and evil doers.
 Allah says that Namaz is my right and I can forgive my right. But lying, slandering, harming others – these are the rights of the men (Haqooq-ul-Ibad).

Political Efforts 
He strongly opposed Pakistan's American sponsored and CIA backed clandestine involvement in Soviet–Afghan War and openly criticized. At the time when most of the political-religious leaders and religious parties were supportive of Pakistan's role in so called Afghan Jihad , he was of the opinion that Muslims were being used as a fuel for this war and South Asia would bear serious repercussions as a result. He was a strong critic of Kashmir Jihad waged through private armies and Jihadi groups. He was of the opinion that "if Pakistan could be created through non-violent and non-militant political struggle, table talks and dialogue, then why Kashmir Conflict cannot be resolved without proxy war. He never recognized Taliban regime in Afghanistan as a legitimate Islamic and democratic regime and openly criticized it.

References 

2012 deaths
Pakistani Sunni Muslim scholars of Islam
Punjabi people
Hanafis
Date of birth missing
1926 births
Deobandis